Shib Koh is a district in Farah Province, Afghanistan which borders Iran. Its population, which is 50% Pashtun and 45% Tajik, along with other ethnic groups, was estimated at 328,000 in January 2005. The district fell to the Taliban on 12 December 2018, after Afghan troops withdrew.

References

External links
 Map of Shib Koh (PDF)

Districts of Farah Province